The 4A Dulles District is a high school conference in the state of Virginia that includes schools from Northern Virginia, with all of its full-time members from Loudoun County. 4A is the third largest enrollment class of the Virginia High School League and is typically very competitive in Virginia high school sports.

The Dulles District schools compete in the 4A West Region with the schools from Conference 21A, Conference 22, Conference 23, and Conference 24.

History and Facts about the District
The Dulles District was created in 2001 from all six Loudoun County high schools that were in the AA Northwestern District, which were Broad Run High School, Loudoun County High School, Loudoun Valley High School, Park View High School, Potomac Falls High School, and Stone Bridge High School.

The Dulles District's name is derived from the district's proximity to Washington Dulles International Airport, which is located in eastern Loudoun County.

Membership Changes
Loudoun County's growth has been a factor in creating the Dulles District as more high schools in the county were being built during the 2000s, including four new members in the district since its founding in 2001.  In 2002, Heritage High School opened; in 2003, Dominion High School opened; in 2005, Briar Woods High School and Freedom High School opened. In 2005, Loudoun Valley was moved to the AAA National District and Stone Bridge moved to the AAA Liberty District because their enrollments were considerably above the AA/AAA enrollment cutoffs. In 2007, George Mason High School in Falls Church, Virginia became the first non-Loudoun County school to enter the Dulles District, though only as a part-time member for lacrosse only, as their district, the A Bull Run District did not hold enough members to sponsor it. Mason's swim team will also be competing in the Dulles District in the 2009–2010 season.  In 2009, Heritage was moved to the AAA Cedar Run District and the AAA Northwest Region due to their increasing enrollment.

Woodgrove High School of Purcellville and Tuscarora High School of Leesburg joined the district when they opened in 2010.  Loudoun Valley and Heritage returned to AA in 2011 because of the new school openings. In 2011, Broad Run and Freedom moved up to the AAA Cedar Run District.

John Champe High School joined the AA Dulles District when the school opened in 2012 and Independence High School and Lightridge High School joined the Dulles district when the schools opened in 2019 and 2020.

In the 2013–2014 school year, the Dulles District will be split as a result of the overall VHSL realignment.  Current and former member schools in the 5A classification, Briar Woods, Broad Run, Freedom, Potomac Falls and Tuscarora will form the new Potomac District.  Stone Bridge will remain in the Liberty District. Schools in the 4A and 3A classification, Champe, Dominion, Heritage, Loudoun County, Loudoun Valley, Park View, Riverside, and Woodgrove will remain in the Dulles District.  In the postseason, schools will compete only against members of the same group classification.

Strengths and Notable Facts on the Dulles District
In 2001, the Dulles District was expected to be a football powerhouse, with Park View, the AA Division 4 runner up in 1999 and 2000 leading the way.  Former Park View coach and teacher Mickey Thompson went to Stone Bridge to start up the new program there, and the Bulldogs were also expected to be another strong contender for the AA title.  Both schools were very competitive in the district's initial years, but Park View's program steadily declined as players who first had Thompson at Park View graduated, and Stone Bridge moved to AAA after winning two AA Region II Division 4 titles.  Loudoun Valley also made a playoff appearance in 2003 but is also in AAA. This trend has reversed this year, however, with three of the districts teams making playoff appearances (Briar Woods, Broad Run, and Park View).  Broad Run has won the last two VHSL AA Division 4 state championships, in 2008 and 2009. In recent years, Briar Woods has emerged as a football powerhouse as they defeated Broad Run twice in 2010 en route to a state championship and lost once (to Broad Run) en route to a second state championship in 2011. The Falcons began the 2012 season with an early away victory at Broad Run and capped a perfect 15–0 season, rolling over Lynchburg Heritage 52–0 in the championship game to garner a third consecutive title.

Dulles District schools have been among the strongest in Virginia in softball, girls soccer, volleyball, and girls basketball, with multiple members earning AA tournament berths and AA titles since the district's founding.  Boys and Girls lacrosse was offered as a varsity sport for the first time in Loudoun County high schools in 2002, and girls' field hockey may be added as well within a few years.

The biggest strength of the Dulles District as a league is not its sports however, but it is because seven out of the ten Loudoun schools routinely play each other in all sports, making the AA Dulles District the mainstay of Loudoun County athletics.  In addition, the Dulles District is the only AA (and non-AAA) district with all of its members in Northern Virginia.  This has also allowed more exposure on Loudoun County high school sports in the Washington area, because many Northwestern District members are located in the northern Shenandoah Valley and do not receive much exposure due to their distance from the immediate Washington area.

Dulles District members schedule non-district members primarily against schools in the AA Northwestern District and they also regularly play some high schools in the Eastern Panhandle of West Virginia, including Jefferson, Hampshire, and Musselman.

State Champions since 2001-2002
{| class="wikitable" style="float:center;"
|-
! colspan=3 | Virginia State Championships
|-
! Year
! Sport/Competition
!School
|-
|2001–2002
|Girls Volleyball
|Loudoun Valley
|-
|2001–2002
|Golf
|Potomac Falls
|-
|2002
|Softball
|Park View
|-
|2002
|Boys Tennis
|Potomac Falls
|-
|2003
|Girls Tennis
|Loudoun County
|-
|2003
|Softball
|Loudoun Valley
|-
|2004
|Girls Soccer
|Potomac Falls
|-
|2004–2005
|Cheerleading
|Stone Bridge
|-
|2004–2005
|Girls Volleyball
|Loudoun Valley
|-
|2005
|Softball
|Loudoun Valley
|-
|2005
|Girls Soccer
|Stone Bridge
|-
|2006
|Boys Tennis
|Loudoun County
|-
|2006
|Boys Soccer
|Potomac Falls
|-
|2007
|Girls Track and Field
|Park View
|-
|2007
|Softball
|Broad Run
|-
|2007
|Girls Volleyball
|Loudoun County
|-
|2008
|Softball
|Broad Run
|-
|2008
|Girls Soccer
|Broad Run
|-
|2008
|Girls Track and Field
|Park View
|-
|2008
|Girls Volleyball
|Loudoun County
|-
|2008
|Football
|Broad Run
|-
|2008–2009
|Division 4 Girls Basketball
|Loudoun County
|-
|2008–2009
|Division 3 Girls Basketball
|Freedom
|-
|2009
|Softball
|Broad Run
|-
|2009
|Girls Soccer
|Broad Run
|-
|2009
|Girls Volleyball
|Loudoun County
|-
|2009
|Cheerleading
|Briar Woods
|-
|2009
|Football
|Broad Run
|-
|2009–2010
|Division 4 Girls Basketball
|Freedom
|-
|2009–2010
|Division 4 Boys Basketball
|Potomac Falls
|-
|2010
|Cheerleading
|Briar Woods
|-
|2010
|Football
|Briar Woods
|-
|2011
|Division 4 Boys Basketball
|Potomac Falls
|-
|2011
|Girls Soccer
|Broad Run
|-
|2011
|Softball
|Briar Woods
|-
|2011
|Cheerleading
|Briar Woods
|-
|2011
|Football
|Briar Woods
|-
|2012
|Softball
|Woodgrove
|-
|2012
|Girls Soccer
|Woodgrove
|-
|2016
|Cheerleading
|Riverside
|-
|2017
|Marching Band
|Riverside
|-
|2017
|Girls Swimming
|Riverside
|-
|2017
|Boys Soccer
|Riverside
|-
|2017
|Boys Lacrosse
|Riverside
|-
|2018
|Marching Band
|Riverside
|-
|2018
|Girls Lacrosse
|Riverside
|-
|2018
|Boys Tennis
|Riverside
|-
|2018
|Football
|Woodgrove
|-
|2019
|Boys Lacrosse
|Riverside
|}

Total Number of State Championships
{| class="wikitable" style="float:center;"
|-
! colspan=3 | Virginia State Championships
|-
! School
! No. of Titles
! Founded
|-
| Loudoun County
| 6
| 1954
|-
| Loudoun Valley
| 4
| 1963
|-
| Park View
| 3
| 1976
|-
| Heritage
| 0
| 2002
|-
| Dominion
| 0
| 2003
|- 
| Woodgrove
| 3
| 2010
|-
| Riverside
| 9
|2015
|-

|}

2011-2012 District Champions

Fall Sports Regular Season Champions
Cheerleading: Briar Woods Falcons
Boys Cross Country: Loudoun County Raiders
Girls Cross Country: Potomac Falls Panthers
Golf: Dominion Titans (Season) - Briar Woods Falcons (Tournament)
Football: Briar Woods Falcons
Volleyball: Loudoun County Raiders

Winter Sports Regular Season Champions
Boys Basketball: Potomac Falls Panthers
Girls Basketball: Loudoun County Raiders
Girls Gymnastics: Freedom Eagles
Boys Swimming: Broad Run Spartans
Girls Swimming: Briar Woods Falcons
Wrestling: Freedom Eagles

Spring Sports Regular Season Champions
Baseball: Potomac Falls Panthers
Boys Lacrosse: Briar Woods Falcons
Girls Lacrosse: Woodgrove Wolverines
Boys Soccer: Broad Run Spartans
Girls Soccer: Broad Run Spartans
Softball: Briar Woods Falcons
Boys Tennis: Freedom Eagles
Girls Tennis: Broad Run Spartans
Boys Track: Loudoun County Raiders
Girls Track: Briar Woods Falcons

Member schools
Broad Run Spartans, Ashburn
Dominion Titans, Sterling
Heritage Pride, Leesburg
Independence Tigers, Ashburn
Lightridge Lightning, Aldie
Loudoun County Captains, Leesburg
Loudoun Valley Vikings, Purcellville
Park View Patriots, Sterling
Tuscarora Huskies, Leesburg
Rock Ridge Phoenix, Ashburn

Former Dulles Members
Freedom High School, played from 2005 to 2011
Stone Bridge High School, played from 2001 to 2005
Briar Woods Falcons, Ashburn
John Champe Knights, Aldie
Potomac Falls Panthers, Sterling
Riverside Rams, Leesburg
Rock Ridge Phoenix, Ashburn
George Mason Mustangs, Falls Church (Only for lacrosse and swimming)
Woodgrove Wolverines, Purcellville

External links
Gameday Magazine Covers All Loudoun High Schools and Broadcasts Hundreds of Loudoun County athletic events during the year on the Gameday Radio Network: Covers in depth on all sports in the Dulles District.
Loudoun Field Hockey Association: Youth and adult field hockey league in Loudoun County.
Potomac Field Hockey: leagues for adult and youth, with skills clinics

Education in Loudoun County, Virginia
Virginia High School League
2001 establishments in Virginia